Limestone Creek is a stream in Bates County, Missouri. It is a tributary of Miami Creek.

Limestone Creek was named for deposits of limestone in the area.

See also
List of rivers of Missouri

References

Rivers of Bates County, Missouri
Rivers of Missouri